Starship Hector, originally released as , is an alternating vertically & horizontally scrolling shooter developed and published by Hudson Soft for the Nintendo Entertainment System. Similar to Xevious, the player's starship has two modes of fire: one to tackle flying enemies and one for ground-based ones.

Starship Hector is a follow-up to Hudson Soft's earlier shooter Star Soldier, itself inspired by Tecmo's Star Force, an arcade game that Hudson had ported to the Famicom in 1985.

The background music of Starship Hector was reused as background music in Super Star Soldier. The theme also appears in the Wii title Kororinpa, which itself has many themes from older Hudson Soft games. The game was ported in 1995 to the Super Famicom,  along with Star Force and Star Soldier, in the Caravan Shooting Collection  released exclusively in Japan.

References

1987 video games
Nintendo Entertainment System games
Nintendo Entertainment System-only games
Science fiction video games
Horizontally scrolling shooters
Hudson Soft games
Video games developed in Japan
Video games scored by Takeaki Kunimoto
Single-player video games